Mia Franzén (born 13 July 1971) is a Swedish Liberal People's Party politician. She was a member of the Riksdag from 2002 to 2006.

External links
Mia Franzén at the Riksdag website

1971 births
Living people
Members of the Riksdag from the Liberals (Sweden)
Women members of the Riksdag
Members of the Riksdag 2002–2006
21st-century Swedish women politicians
Place of birth missing (living people)